Orville Prescott (September 8, 1906, Cleveland, Ohio – April 28, 1996, New Canaan, Connecticut) was the main book reviewer for The New York Times for 24 years.

Born in Cleveland, Prescott graduated from Williams College in 1930. He began his career as a researcher for Newsweek, then known as News-Week, and became the literary editor of Cue Magazine before joining the Times, where he wrote three or four book reviews every week from 1942 through 1966. More than any other reviewer, he influenced sales of books across the country, and was held in high esteem. His reviews showed a preference for traditional novels with strong narratives and clear characterizations.

In 1958 he reviewed Lolita by Vladimir Nabokov and described it as "dull, dull, dull in a pretentious, florid and archly fatuous fashion." In 1961, Gore Vidal wrote a scathing portrait of Prescott as a reviewer. Vidal later wrote that Prescott was so offended by his depiction of a homosexual love affair in The City and the Pillar that he refused to review his work or allow the Times to review it.

Prescott edited three anthologies about history and after his retirement wrote two books about the Italian Renaissance.

Works
In My Opinion: An Inquiry into the Contemporary Novel (1952)
The Five Dollar Gold Piece: The Development of a Point of View (1956)
 Robin Hood: The Outlaw of Sherwood Forest, illustrated by Charles Beck (1959) – children's picture book, 
 Undying Past (1961)
 A Father Reads to His Children: An Anthology of Prose and Poetry (1965)
Princes of the Renaissance: A Chronicle of the Private Lives and Public Careers of the Kings, Dukes, Popes and Despots Who Ruled Italy in the Fifteenth Century (1969)
History as Literature (1971)
 Lords of Italy: Portraits from the Middle Ages (1972)
Mid-Century: An Anthology of Distinguished Contemporary American Short Stories (1973)

References

External links 
 

1906 births
1996 deaths
American literary critics
Critics employed by The New York Times
20th-century American non-fiction writers